(Main list of acronyms)


 U – (s) Uranium
 U&E – Urea and electrolytes, see also Basic metabolic panel

UA
 UA – (s) Ukraine (ISO 3166 digram) (i) Unit of Action
 UAAP – (i) University Athletic Association of the Philippines
 UAB – (i) University of Alabama at Birmingham
 UAE – (i/s) United Arab Emirates (also IOC and FIFA trigram, but not ISO 3166)
 UAH
 (s) Ukrainian hryvnia (ISO 4217 currency code)
 (i) University of Alabama in Huntsville
 UAR
 (i) Uniformly At Random (probability)
 Unión Argentina de Rugby (Spanish for "Argentine Rugby Union")
 United Arab Republic
 UAV – (i) Unmanned Aerial Vehicle

UB
 UBA – Unbundled Bitstream Access
 UBC
 (i) United Baptist Church
 University of British Columbia
 UBE – (i) Uniform Bar Examination (US)
 UBIGEO – (i) Ubicación Geografica (Spanish for Geographical Location)
 UBS – Union Bank of Switzerland

UC
 UCAV – (a/i) Unmanned Combat Air Vehicle
 UCBSA – (i) United Cricket Board of South Africa
 UCF – (i) University of Central Florida
 UCI
 (i) Union Cycliste Internationale (French, "International Cycling Union")
 University of California, Irvine
 UÇK – (i) initialism for two Albanian guerilla movements
 UCLA – (i) University of California, Los Angeles (cf. UCLA Bruins, this school's athletic program)
 UCLES – (i) University of Cambridge Local Examinations Syndicate
 UCR
 (i) University of Costa Rica
 University of California, Riverside
 UCS – (i) Union of Concerned Scientists
 UCSB – (i) University of California, Santa Barbara
 UCSD – (i) University of California, San Diego

UD
 UDAS – (a) Uppsala-DLR Asteroid Survey
 UDDI – (a) Universal Description, Discovery and Integration
 UDP – (i) User Datagram Protocol
 UDT – (i) Underwater Demolition Team
 UDTS – (i) Uppsala-DLR Trojan Survey

UE
 UE – (i) Unit of Employment
 UEFA – (a) Union of European Football Associations
 UEFI - (i/a) Unified Extensible Firmware Interface
 UESAC – (a) Uppsala-ESO Survey of Asteroids and Comets

UF
 UFC – (i) Ultimate Fighting Championship
 UFO
 (i) Unidentified flying object
 United Farmers of Ontario

UG
 ug – (s) Uyghur language (ISO 639-1 code)
 UG – (s) Uganda (ISO 3166 and FIPS 10-4 country code digram)
 UGA – (s) Uganda (ISO 3166 trigram)
 UGV – (i) Unmanned Ground Vehicle
 UGX – (s) ugandan shilling (ISO 4217 currency code)

UH
 UHF – (i) Ultra High Frequency
 UHMW – (i) Ultra-high-molecular-weight polyethylene
 UHRB – (i) Ultra-High Resolution Building (simulation)
 UHNWIs - (i) Ultra High Net Worth Individuals Investopedia and Wikipedia

UI
 UIC – (i) University of Illinois Chicago
 UID – (i) User ID
 uig – (s) Uyghur language (ISO 639-2 code)
 UIL – (i) University Interscholastic League (governing body for most interscholastic activities, notably sports, in Texas public high schools)
 UIUC – (i) University of Illinois Urbana-Champaign
 UIW – (i) University of the Incarnate Word

UJ
 UJTL – (i) Universal Joint Task List
 UJT – Unijunction transistor

UK
 uk – (s) Ukrainian language (ISO 639-1 code)
 UK
 (i) United Kingdom (also (s) FIPS 10-4 country code)
 (i) University of Kentucky
 UKDA – (i) United Kingdom Data Archive 
 UKIP - (a) UK Independence Party
 ukr – (s) Ukrainian language (ISO 639-2 code)
 UKR – (s) Ukraine (ISO 3166 trigram)

UL
 UL – (i) Underwriters Laboratories
 ULEB – (a) Union des ligues européens de basket-ball, French for "Union of European Basketball Leagues"
 ULF – (i) Ultra Low Frequency
 ULOF – unprotected loss of flow (nuclear accident)
 ULOHS – unprotected loss of heat sink (nuclear accident)
 UTOP – unprotected transient overpower (nuclear accident)

UM
 UM – (s) United States Minor Outlying Islands (postal symbol; ISO 3166 digram)
 UMA – (i) Upper Memory Area
 UMB – (i) University of Maryland, Baltimore
 UMBC – (i) University of Maryland, Baltimore County
 UMC – (i) United Microelectronics Corporation – University of Missouri–Columbia
 UMD – (i) University of Maryland, College Park
 UMCP – (i) University of Maryland, College Park
 UMES – (i) University of Maryland Eastern Shore
 UMGC – (i) University of Maryland, Global Campus
 UMI – (s) United States Minor Outlying Islands  (ISO 3166 trigram)
 UMIST – (a) University of Manchester Institute of Science and Technology
 UMK – (i) Uniwersytet Mikołaja Kopernika (Polish "Nicolaus Copernicus University")
 UML –  (i) Unified Marxist-Leninist Communist Party of Nepal – Unified Modeling Language – University of Massachusetts Lowell – User-Mode Linux
 UMNO – (a) United Malays National Organisation (Malaysia)
 UMTS – (i) Universal Mobile Telecommunications System

UN
 UN – (i) United Nations
 UNABOM – (p) University and airline bomber (FBI case name)
 UNAIDS – (i/a) Joint United Nations Programme on HIV/AIDS
 UNaM – (p/a) Universidad Nacional de Misiones (Spanish, "National University of Misiones")
 UNAM – (a) Universidad Nacional Autónoma de México (Spanish, "National Autonomous University of Mexico")
 UNAMSIL – (p) United Nations Mission in Sierra Leone
 UNCF – (i) United Negro College Fund
 UNCLOS – (a) United Nations Convention on the Law of the Sea
 UNCSGN – (i) United Nations Conference on the Standardization of Geographical Names
 UNCTAD – (p) United Nations Conference on Trade and Development
 UNDCP – (i) United Nations Drug Control Programme
 UNDE – (i/a) Union of National Defence Employees (Canada)
 UNDP – (i) United Nations Development Programme
 UNEP – (a) United Nations Environment Programme
 UNESCO – (a) United Nations Educational, Scientific and Cultural Organization
 UNFCCC – (i) United Nations Framework Convention on Climate Change
 UNFICYP – (p) United Nations Peacekeeping Force in Cyprus
 UNGEGN – (i) United Nations Group of Experts on Geographical Names
 UNHCR – (i) United Nations High Commissioner for Refugees
 UNICEF – (a) United Nations Children's Fund (originally the United Nations International Children's Emergency Fund)
 UNICRI – (p) United Nations Interregional Crime and Justice Research Institute
 UNIDO – (a) United Nations Industrial Development Organization
 UNIFEM – (p) United Nations Development Fund for Women (from the French Fonds de développement des Nations unies pour la femme)
 UNIS – (p) University of Surrey
 UNLV – (i) University of Nevada, Las Vegas
 UNMIK – (p) United Nations Interim Administration Mission in Kosovo
 UNMOVIC – (p) United Nations Monitoring, Verification and Inspection Commission
 UNOSOM – (p) United Nations Operations in Somalia
 UNPROFOR – (p) United Nations Protection Force (in former Yugoslavia)
 UNRISD – (i) United Nations Research Institute for Social Development
 UNSM – (i) Union of Nova Scotia Municipalities
 UNTAC – (a) United Nations Transitional Authority in Cambodia
 UNTAET – (i/a) United Nations Transitional Administration in East Timor
 UNU – (i) United Nations University

UP
 UP
 (s) Ukraine (FIPS 10-4 country code)
 Union Pacific Railroad (AAR reporting mark)
 (i) Upper Peninsula (of Michigan)
 Uttar Pradesh
 UPC
 (i) United Pentecostal Church
 (i) Universal Product Code
 UPDA – Uganda People's Democratic Army
 UPdM – (i) Università Popolare della Multimedialità
 UPDM – Unified Profile for DoDAF/MODAF
 Unified Modeling Language Profile for DoDAF and MoDAF
 Unité de psychiatrie du développement mental
 Universal Pattern Decomposition Method
 Unix Power Device Management
 Unpressurized Docking Mast
 Urban Planning, Design and Management
 UPF – (i) Universitat Pompeu Fabra (Catalan, "Pompeu Fabra University")
 UPI – (i) United Press International
 UPN – (i) United Paramount Network
 UPS
 (i) Uninterruptible Power Supply
 United Parcel Service
 UPT – Universal Personal Telecommunications
 UPTN – Upper Peninsula Telehealth Network
 UPU – (i) Universal Postal Union

UR
 ur – (s) Urdu language (ISO 639-1 code)
 UR – (s) Soviet Union (NATO country code, obsolete 1992)
 URBSFA – (i) Union royale belge des sociétés de football association (French for Royal Belgian Football Association)
 URC
 (i) Uganda Railways Corporation
 United Rugby Championship
 Utility regulatory commission
 urd – (s) Urdu language (ISO 639-2 code)
 URD – (i) User requirements document
 URI
 (i) Uniform Resource Identifier
 University of Rhode Island
 URL – (a/i) Uniform Resource Locator ("earl")
 URU – (s) Uruguay (IOC and FIFA trigram, but not ISO 3166)
 URY – (s) Uruguay (ISO 3166 trigram)

US
 US – (i) United States (also (s) ISO 3166 and FIPS 10-4 country code digram)
  
 (i) United States of America (also (s) ISO 3166 trigram)
 United States Army
 USAF – (i) United States Air Force
 USAFSPC – (i) U.S. Air Force Space Command
 USAACE – (p) United States Army Aviation Center of Excellence, Fort Rucker, Alabama
 USAADAC – (i) United States Army Air Defense Artillery School, Fort Sill, Oklahoma
 USAAS – (p) United States Army Armor School, Ft. Benning, Georgia
 USAIC
 (i) U.S. Army Infantry Center
 U.S. Army Intelligence Center
 USAID – (a/i) United States Agency for International Development
 USAP
 (a) Union Sportive des Arlequins Perpignanais
 (i) United States Antarctic Program
 USAPATRIOT – (i) Uniting and Strengthening America by Providing Appropriate Tools Required to Intercept and Obstruct Terrorism
 USAREUR – (p) United States Army Europe
 USB – (i) Universal Serial Bus
 USC
 (i) United States Code
 University of South Carolina
 University of Southern California
 USCG – (i) United States Coast Guard
 USCINCSPACE – (p) United States Commander in Chief, Space Command
 USD
 (s) United States dollar (ISO 4217 currency code)
 USD(A&S)  – (i) Under Secretary of Defense for Acquisition and Sustainment
 ASD(R&E) Under Secretary of Defense for Research and Engineering
 USD(C) – (i) (U.S.) Under Secretary of Defense (Comptroller)
 USDA – (i) United States Department of Agriculture
 USDI – (i) United States Department of the Interior
 USDOE – (i) United States Department of Energy
 USD(I) – Under Secretary of Defense for Intelligence
 USDPR – (i) (U.S.) Under Secretary of Defense for Personnel and Readiness
 USDP – (i) (U.S.) Under Secretary of Defense for Policy
 USDRE – (i) (U.S.) Under Secretary of Defense for Research and Engineering
 USEC – (a) United States Enrichment Corporation
 USFL – (i) United States Football League, two different leagues of American football, one operating from 1983–1985 and the second having started play in 2022
 USFWS – (i) United States Fish and Wildlife Service
 USGS – (i) United States Geological Survey
 USIA – (i) United States Information Agency
 USJFCOM – (p) United States Joint Forces Command
 USL
 (i) United Soccer League (formerly United Soccer Leagues), a governing body for several lower-level leagues in the United States
 United Soccer League, the former name of a league operated by the above organization that now plays at the second U.S. level as the USL Championship
 United Soccer League, a completely different soccer league that operated in 1984 and 1985
 University of Southwestern Louisiana, a former name for the school now known as the University of Louisiana at Lafayette
 USLC – (i) USL Championship
 USLS – (i) USL Super League (women's soccer league starting play in 2023)
 USLW
 (i) USL W-League, a women's soccer league operated by the United Soccer League organization from 1995 to 2015
 USL W League, another women's league operated by the same organization that started play in 2022
 USMC – (i) United States Marine Corps
 USMNT – (i) United States men's national (soccer) team
 USN – (i) United States Navy
 USNA – (i) United States National Arboretum – United States Naval Academy
 USNB – (i) United States Naval Base
 USNG – (i) United States National Grid
 USNH – (i) United States Naval Hospital
 USNI – (i) United States Naval Institute
 USNO – (i) U.S. Naval Observatory
 USNOFS – (i) United States Naval Observatory Flagstaff Station
 USNP – (i) United States Newspaper Program
 USNR – (i) United States Navy Reserve
 USNS – (i) United States Naval Ship
 USNY – (a) University of the State of New York (usually pronounced "use-knee")
 USNZ – (i) University Sport New Zealand
 USP – (i) Unique Selling Point
 USPS – (i) United States Postal Service
 USPTO – (i) United States Patent and Trademark Office
 USR
 (a) Universal System Resources (/usr, directory in a *NIX filesystem)
 (s) User
 USS – (i) United States ship (sometimes meaningless, see Star Trek)
 USSPACECOM – (p) United States Space Command
 USSR – (i) Union of Soviet Socialist Republics
 UST – (i) Underground Storage Tank
 USTRANSCOM – (p) United States Transportation Command
 USWNT – (i) United States women's national (soccer) team

UT
 UT – (i) Universal Time
 UTEP – (a/i) University of Texas at El Paso (pronounced you-tep)
 UTM – (i) Universal Transverse Mercator (geographical co-ordinate system)
 UTRGV – (i) University of Texas Rio Grande Valley

UU
 UU – (i) Unitarian Universalism – University of Utah – Unseen University
 UUA – (i) Unitarian Universalist Association
 UUID – (i) Universally Unique Identifier (see also GUID)
 UUV – (i) Unmanned Underwater Vehicle

UV
 UV – (s) Burkina Faso (FIPS 10-4 country code; from Upper Volta) – (p) ultraviolet
 UVM
 (i) Universal Verification Methodology
 (i) Universidad del Valle de México
 (i) University of Vermont, from its Latin name of Universitas Viridis Montis ("University of the Green Mountains")
 (i) UV mapping

UW
 UW – (i) University of Washington
 UWO – (i) University of Western Ontario
 UWW – (i) United World Wrestling

UX
 UXO – (p) Unexploded ordnance

UY
 UY – (s) Uruguay (ISO 3166 and FIPS 10-4 country code digram)--Up yours
 UYU – (s) Uruguayan peso uruguayo (ISO 4217 currency code)

UZ
 uz – (s) Uzbek language (ISO 639-1 code)
 UZ – (s) Uzbekistan (ISO 3166 and FIPS 10-4 country code digram)
 uzb – (s) Uzbek language (ISO 639-2 code)
 UZB – (s) Uzbekistan (ISO 3166 trigram)
 UZS – (s) Uzbek soum (ISO 4217 currency code)

Acronyms U